"The Big Salad" is the 88th episode of the NBC sitcom Seinfeld. This was the second episode for the sixth season. It aired on September 29, 1994. In this episode, George becomes irritated when he doesn't receive thanks for buying Elaine a salad, Elaine must deal with an annoying store clerk in order to get her boss a rare top-of-the-line pencil, Kramer fears he may be partially responsible for the murder of a dry cleaner, and Jerry comes to suspect there is something wrong with his girlfriend when he learns she was dumped by Newman.

Plot
At Elaine's request, George purchases a "big salad" to go for her from Monk's. George's girlfriend Julie hands Elaine the salad in Jerry's apartment, and Elaine thanks her. George is displeased that Julie took the credit for the salad, and tells Elaine that he bought it. Elaine is irritated at George for making a point of such a trivial matter, and briefly vents to Julie about this. Julie is so disappointed that George told Elaine she didn't buy the salad that she breaks up with him, saying that all she simply did was hand over the bag containing the salad.

Elaine must find a special mechanical pencil, the Rolamech 1000, for Mr. Pitt. The stationery store clerk makes unwanted romantic advances, so when he asks for her telephone number to call her when he receives the pencil, Elaine gives him Jerry's number instead. Over the course of the episode, the clerk calls Jerry's number several times asking for her. Later, after purchasing the pencil from a different shop, she reluctantly agrees to go out with the clerk out of guilt when she hears that he went to great lengths to obtain the pencil.

Jerry learns that his girlfriend, Margaret, formerly dated Newman, who ended the relationship. Jerry cannot comprehend why Newman dumped someone so clearly "out of his league" and "wasn't [his] type", so he attempts to find the fault in his girlfriend. Margaret becomes suspicious of his scrutiny and challenges him to kiss her. Jerry is unable to overcome his Newman-fueled misgivings enough to do so, and she dumps him.

Kramer plays golf with ex-Major League Baseball player Steve Gendason, who cleans his ball on the second shot (not on the green), breaking the rules and causing an altercation with Kramer. Later the same day, Steve murders a dry cleaner. Fearing that Steve's anger over their golf altercation may have been a factor in the murder, Kramer helps Steve see his pet fish by driving in his white Ford Bronco in a low-speed chase down the New Jersey Turnpike.

Production
Writer/co-creator Larry David got the idea for the episode when Seinfeld editor Janet Ashikaga asked him to get her "a big salad" for lunch. David bought her the salad, but when Jerry Seinfeld's assistant Carol handed it to her, she thanked Carol instead.

The Steve Gendason plot, and in particular Margaret's argument about overwhelming circumstantial evidence and the Ford Bronco chase, satirizes the O. J. Simpson murder case. The episode was written just a few weeks after Simpson's real-world Ford Bronco chase.

This episode is the first to use a new exterior set for its New York street scenes. Exteriors were formerly shot using a collection of three storefronts, but the show moved its outside shots to a new, much more expensive street set in Season 6 that allowed for many new camera angles and framing opportunities.

References

External links 
 

Seinfeld (season 6) episodes
1994 American television episodes
Television episodes written by Larry David